Cryptantha scoparia is a species of flowering plant in the borage family known by the common name Miners candle. It has been found in Idaho, Nevada, Montana, Wyoming, Utah, and Colorado but there have only been 5 confirmed sightings in recent years. It is a small slender herb which prefers open sunny sites often in semi arid canyons and hillsides.

References

External links

scoparia